Andreas Schjølberg Hanche-Olsen (born 17 January 1997) is a Norwegian professional footballer who plays as a defender for Bundesliga club Mainz 05 and the Norway national team.

Club career

Stabæk
On 26 November 2015, Hanche-Olsen signed his first professional contract with Stabæk. He was named captain ahead of the 2018 season after former captain Morten Morisbak Skjønsberg retired.

Gent
On 5 October 2020, Olsen signed for a Gent for €800k fee.

On 17 October 2020, Olsen made his League and goal debut against Cercle Brugge.

On 22 October 2020, Olsen made his debut on UEFA Europa League.

Mainz
On 13 January 2023, Olsen signed a four-and-a-half year contract with Bundesliga club Mainz 05 for €2.5 million fee.

Career statistics

Club

References

External links
 Profile at the 1. FSV Mainz 05 website 
 
 
 

1997 births
Living people
Sportspeople from Bærum
Norwegian footballers
Association football defenders
Norway youth international footballers
Norway under-21 international footballers
Norway international footballers
Norwegian Second Division players
Eliteserien players
Belgian Pro League players
Stabæk Fotball players
K.A.A. Gent players
1. FSV Mainz 05 players
Norwegian expatriate footballers
Norwegian expatriate sportspeople in Belgium
Expatriate footballers in Belgium
Norwegian expatriate sportspeople in Germany
Expatriate footballers in Germany
Place of birth missing (living people)